Aleksei Vladimirovich Medvedev (born 5 October 1972 in Minsk) is a Belarusian wrestler. At the 1996 Summer Olympics he won the silver medal in the men's Freestyle Heavyweight (under 130 kg) category.

References 
 

1972 births
Living people
Sportspeople from Minsk
Wrestlers at the 1996 Summer Olympics
Wrestlers at the 2000 Summer Olympics
Belarusian male sport wrestlers
Olympic wrestlers of Belarus
Olympic silver medalists for Belarus
Olympic medalists in wrestling
Medalists at the 1996 Summer Olympics
21st-century Belarusian people
20th-century Belarusian people